is a Japanese former competitive figure skater. He is the 1995 World Junior bronze medalist and Japanese national bronze medalist.

Suzuki graduated from Meiji University. After retiring from competition, he skated for Prince Hotels and became a coach.

Results
GP: Champions Series / Grand Prix

References

Japanese male single skaters
1976 births
Sportspeople from Tokyo
Living people
World Junior Figure Skating Championships medalists
Figure skaters at the 1999 Asian Winter Games
Competitors at the 1997 Winter Universiade